Volume 2: Status: Ships Commander Butchered is the second extended play (EP) by American desert rock collective The Desert Sessions. Recorded in August 1997 at Rancho De La Luna, it was released by Man's Ruin Records on February 10, 1998. The album features eight credited musicians, including Josh Homme, John McBain and Ben Shepherd. It was later re-released with Volume 1: Instrumental Driving Music for Felons in 1998 as Volumes 1 & 2.

Recording and release
The first two Desert Sessions EPs were recorded in sessions between August 5 and 12, 1997 at Rancho De La Luna in Joshua Tree, California, a studio founded by Fred Drake and Dave Catching. The tracks on Volume 2 were engineered by Drake, with Catching assisting, and feature a total of eight credited musicians: Josh Homme (guitar, vocals, bass and keyboards), John McBain (guitar and keyboards), Ben Shepherd (bass and guitar), Brant Bjork (drums, percussion and bass), Peter Stahl (vocals), Alfredo Hernández (drums and percussion), Drake and Catching (both percussion). Homme mixed the album, and it was mastered by Tom Baker at Future Disc in Hollywood, Los Angeles, California.

Volume 2 was initially released alone on vinyl by Man's Ruin Records on February 10, 1998. It later received a re-release with its predecessor, Volume 1: Instrumental Driving Music for Felons, on CD on February 24, 1998 as Volumes 1 & 2.

Critical reception

Music website AllMusic awarded Volume 2: Status: Ships Commander Butchered three out of five stars. In a four-star review of Volumes 1 & 2 for the website, Tom Schulte said the following about the albums: "Propelled by a steady rhythm section, guitars or keyboards creep in to contribute mostly spectral wails decaying with tremolo or reverb. The picture you get is very much that of a desert, a wasteland divided by a stark streak of asphalt." He summarised the album as a "soundtrack for a running reckless in a land where the only visible things are the dash panel, the headlights, and the stars".

Track listing
All songs written and composed by "Acquitted Felons".

Personnel
Personnel credits adapted from album liner notes.
Musicians
Josh Homme – guitars (tracks 1, 2 and 3), vocals (track 1), bass and keyboards (track 2), percussion (track 3), mixing
John McBain – guitars (tracks 1 and 2), keyboards (track 3)
Ben Shepherd – bass (tracks 1 and 2), guitar (track 3)
Brant Bjork – drums (tracks 1 and 2), bass and percussion (track 3)
Peter Stahl – vocals (tracks 2 and 3)
Alfredo Hernández – drums (tracks 1 and 3), percussion (track 3)
Fred Drake – percussion (track 3), engineering
Dave Catching – percussion (track 3), engineering assistance
Additional personnel
Tom Baker – mastering

References

1998 EPs
The Desert Sessions albums
Man's Ruin Records EPs